Eranina cendira is a species of beetle in the family Cerambycidae. It was described by Bates in 1866. It is known from French Guiana and Brazil.

References

Eranina
Beetles described in 1866